The men's 3×3 qualification for the Olympic basketball tournament will occur between November 2022 and June 2024, allocating eight teams for the final tournament. 

Three quota places will be awarded to the top-ranked teams, including the host nation France, based on the total points calculated in the FIBA 3×3 Ranking List of November 1, 2023, with the remainder attributed to the eligible NOCs in separate wildcard tournaments (two winners of the universality-driven Olympic qualifying tournaments and the top three of the FIBA Olympic Qualifying Tournament).

Method
Eight teams will participate in the men's basketball tournament, with each NOC sending a roster of 3 players and a substitute.

Host nation
As the host nation, France reserves a quota place in the men's 3×3 basketball subject to the FIBA 3×3 Ranking List of November 1, 2023. If the host country fails to enter the team within the ranking list, the number of teams qualified through the regular process shall be increased accordingly.

Qualification via world rankings
Similar to the 2021 format, the top three teams (two if France obtains the host quota place in the men's tournament) on the FIBA 3x3 men's basketball ranking list on November 1, 2023, will qualify for the Olympics. These rankings are also used to determine entrants to both the OQT and UOQT.

Qualification via the wild card tournaments
The five remaining quota places are attributed to the eligible NOCs, including the host nation France if unqualified, through three separate wildcard tournaments: two universality-driven Olympic qualifying tournaments (UOQT) and the FIBA Olympic qualifying tournament (OQT). Teams will be selected based on the following criteria:
 UOQT 1 – The top eight eligible NOCs, including the tournament host, from the FIBA world ranking list, will participate in the first leg of the UOQT with the winner obtaining a direct spot for Paris 2024.
 UOQT 2 – The highest-ranked eligible NOC in the standings from each of the 2023 FIBA Continental Cup (Asia and Oceania, Americas, Europe, and Africa), the tournament host vying for qualification, and the host nation France, if unqualified, will participate in the second leg of the UOQT with the winner obtaining a direct spot for Paris 2024. If the eight-team roster remains vacant, teams will be selected from a maximum of eight highest-ranked eligible NOCs based on the standings from 2023 FIBA 3×3 World Cup.
 OQT – The sixteen highest-ranked eligible NOCs based on the FIBA global standings, including the tournament host and host nation France, if unqualified, will participate in the FIBA OQT with the top three securing the remaining berths for Paris 2024. The sixteen-team roster in the OQT must field a minimum of two NOCs to a maximum of ten from the same continental zone (Asia and Oceania, Americas, Europe, and Africa).

Qualified teams

FIBA Universality-driven Olympic Qualifying Tournament 1 (UOQT1)

Qualified teams

FIBA Universality-driven Olympic Qualifying Tournament 2 (UOQT2)

Qualified teams

FIBA Olympic Qualifying Tournament (OQT)

Qualified teams

References

Basketball at the 2024 Summer Olympics
Qualification for the 2024 Summer Olympics
2024
2024 Summer Olympics – Men's 3x3 qualification